The 2022 Mercedes-Benz UCI Mountain Bike World Cup is a series of races in Olympic Cross-Country (XCO), Cross-Country Eliminator (XCE), and Downhill (DHI). Each discipline has an Elite Men and an Elite Women category. There are also under-23 categories in the XCO and junior categories in the DHI. The cross-country series has nine rounds and the downhill series eight rounds, some of which are held concurrently.

Cross-country

Elite

Under 23

Cross-country short track

Elite

Downhill

Elite

Junior

Cross-country eliminator

E-MTB cross-country

World Cup standings
bold denotes race winners.

Cross-country

Men's

Women's

Cross-country short track

Downhill

Men's

Women's

Cross-country eliminator
Only the best 9 results are taken into account for the final ranking

E-MTB cross-country

See also
 2022 UCI Mountain Bike World Championships

References

External links
2022 UCI Mountain Bike World Cup
2022 UCI Mountain Bike Eliminator World Champions
2022 UCI E-Mountain Bike Cross Country World Cup

UCI Mountain Bike World Cup
World Cup